Abdinuur Qaaji, commonly called Biindhe, was the president of Khatumo State in 2012.

Flag 
It was during Biindhe's reign as Khatumo president that the flag for Khatumo was designed. Rooda Xassan, the flag's designer, said the cavalryman on its design features an anonymous Darawiish; the cavalry during the Dervish era being referred to as Dooxato:

See also
Politics of Somalia

References

Somalian politicians
Living people
Year of birth missing (living people)